Sampson Lort was a Welsh politician who sat in the House of Commons in 1659.

Lort was the second son of Henry Lort of Stackpole, Pembrokeshire and his wife Judith White, daughter of Henry White of Henllam, Pembrokeshire. In 1659, he was elected Member of Parliament for Pembroke in a double return for the Third Protectorate Parliament which was never resolved.

Lort married  a daughter of Sir John Philipps, 1st Baronet, of Picton. He was the brother of Sir Roger Lort, 1st Baronet.

References

Year of birth missing
Year of death missing
Members of the Parliament of England (pre-1707) for constituencies in Wales
People from Pembroke, Pembrokeshire
English MPs 1659